Systomus spilurus is a species of cyprinid fish endemic to Sri Lanka.

References

Systomus
Fish described in 1868
Taxa named by Albert Günther